Arge cyanocrocea, the bramble sawfly, is a species of sawflies of the family Argidae, subfamily Arginae.

Distribution
These sawflies are present in most of Europe, in the Caucasus, in Asia Minor and in Japan.

Description
As all sawflies, this species is related to wasps and not to flies, but lacks the typical wasp waist. Its head and thorax are black, while the abdomen is yellowish orange. Legs are reddish, with small black rings. The wings show a characteristic wide transverse dark band and gray apex. Arge cyanocrocea is rather similar to Arge pagana, that shows black wings.

Biology
These sawflies can be encountered from May to July, feeding on pollen and nectar of several Apiaceae species (Aegopodium podagraria, Meum athamanticum, Heracleum sphondylium, etc.), Euphorbiaceae species (Euphorbia spp.) and Asteraceae species (Tanacetum vulgare).

The larvae of this species look like caterpillars, but they have five pairs of prolegs, while caterpillars have four pairs. They feed on the leaves of brambles (hence the common name), mainly blackberry (Rubus fruticosus), raspberry (Rubus idaeus) and great burnet (Sanguisorba officinalis).

Gallery

References

External links
 Nature Spot

Argidae
Insects described in 1771
Articles containing video clips
Hymenoptera of Europe
Taxa named by Johann Reinhold Forster